Edward "Eddie" Fullerton (26 March 1935 – 25 May 1991) was a Sinn Féin councillor from Inishowen in County Donegal, Ireland. He was killed at his Buncrana home in May 1991 by members of the Ulster Defence Association (UDA).

Childhood and career

The eldest of John and Mary (or Maria) Fullerton's 20 children, Fullerton emigrated to Scotland at the age of 18, and then moved to England. He became involved in Irish republicanism in Birmingham, where he also met and married Diana ( Peach). They returned to Ireland in 1975 and had six children. He was elected to Donegal County Council for Sinn Féin in 1979, and held his seat until his assassination at age 56.

Death
At two o'clock in the morning, on 25 May 1991, Fullerton and his wife were woken by the sound of their front door being knocked in with a sledgehammer. Ulster loyalist paramilitaries shot Fullerton six times from the stairs as he left the bedroom to investigate the noise.

Police file
A month later, a documentary on British television revealed that a police file from Royal Ulster Constabulary (RUC) intelligence containing Fullerton's photograph and details was found in the possession of the UDA in Derry. The weapon used to kill him was recovered two years later. The perpetrators were never found. The Fullerton family has long campaigned for an independent public inquiry into the events surrounding his death.

This was the third killing of an elected representative in the Republic of Ireland since its independence from the United Kingdom.

Aftermath
The shooting dead by the IRA's Derry Brigade of high ranking UDA commander and UDP member Cecil McKnight in the Waterside area of Londonderry a month later was claimed as retaliation for the death of Fullerton.

Arrest
On 12 December 2021, a 56 year old man was arrested around 10am as he was about to attend church in Muff, County Donegal. He was detained under section 30 of the Offences against the person Act and can be detained for up to three days. He was taken to Letterkenny Garda station for questioning. It is the first arrest in the case.

The arrested man was released without charge the following day. A file was to be prepared by the Director of Public Prosecutions.

References

External links
 Relatives for Justice page on Cllr. Eddie Fullerton

1935 births
1991 deaths
Assassinated Irish politicians
Deaths by firearm in the Republic of Ireland
Local councillors in County Donegal
People from Buncrana
People from County Donegal
People killed by the Ulster Defence Association
People murdered in the Republic of Ireland
Sinn Féin politicians
Terrorism deaths in Ireland
1991 murders in the Republic of Ireland